Brevard College Stone Fence and Gate is a historic stone fence and gate located on the campus of Brevard College at Brevard, Transylvania County, North Carolina.  It was erected by the Works Progress Administration in 1936-1937 to enclose the athletic field.  The "L"-shaped structure consists of a diagonally set arcaded gate, flanked by walls measuring about 222 feet and about 252 feet in length.

It was listed on the National Register of Historic Places in 1993.

References

Brevard College
Works Progress Administration in North Carolina
University and college buildings on the National Register of Historic Places in North Carolina
University and college buildings completed in 1937
Buildings and structures in Transylvania County, North Carolina
National Register of Historic Places in Transylvania County, North Carolina